Heviel Cordovés González (born 10 November 1989) is a former Cuban international footballer.

Club career
Cordovés played for hometown team Ciudad de la Habana before his move to the USA where he joined Charleston Battery. In December 2017, he joined fellow United Soccer League side Richmond Kickers.

International career
He made his international debut for Cuba in an August 2008 FIFA World Cup qualification match against Trinidad and Tobago and has earned a total of 9 caps, scoring 1 goal. He represented his country in 4 FIFA World Cup qualifying matches and was named in Cuba's squad for the 2011 Pan-American games and was also named in Cuba's squad that would attempt to qualify for the 2012 Summer Olympics football tournament.

In October 2012, he defected to United States along with teammates Maikel Chang and Odisnel Cooper prior to a 2014 World Cup qualifying game versus Canada in Toronto.

International goals
Scores and results list Cuba's goal tally first.

References

External links 

 

1989 births
Living people
Sportspeople from Havana
Defecting Cuban footballers
Association football forwards
Cuban footballers
Cuba international footballers
Footballers at the 2011 Pan American Games
Pan American Games competitors for Cuba
FC Ciudad de La Habana players
Charleston Battery players
Richmond Kickers players
Memphis 901 FC players
Cuban expatriate footballers
Cuban expatriate sportspeople in the United States
Expatriate soccer players in the United States
USL Championship players